Yichun Mingyueshan Airport  is an airport serving the city of Yichun in Jiangxi Province, China.  It is located in Hutian Town, Yuanzhou District.  As the only airport in western Jiangxi, it also serves the nearby cities of Pingxiang and Xinyu in addition to Yichun, with a total population of 10 million.  It is named after Mingyueshan (Moon Mountain), a national forest park near Yichun.  Construction of the airport began on 26 July 2009. Originally scheduled to open in 2011, the airport opened on 26 June 2013.

Facilities
The airport has a runway that is 2,400 meters long and 45 meters wide (class 4C), and a 6,000 square-meter terminal building.  It is projected to handle 200,000 passengers and 1,200 tons of cargo annually by 2020.

Airlines and destinations

See also
List of airports in China
List of the busiest airports in China

References

Airports in Jiangxi
Airports established in 2013
2013 establishments in China